Jester, in comics, may refer to:

Jester (Quality Comics), a Quality Comics character who has also appeared in DC Comics
Jester (Marvel Comics), a number of Marvel Comics characters
Jester, a Wildstorm Comics character who has appeared in Wetworks (comics)

References

See also
Jester (disambiguation)

Comics